Candice Nelson may refer to:

 Candice Nelson (political scientist), academic at the Center for Congressional and Presidential Studies
 Candice Nelson (songwriter), member of music producers The Clutch